The 1987–88 FIBA Korać Cup season occurred between September 23, 1987, and March 9, 1988. The final was played by Real Madrid of Spain and Cibona of Yugoslavia.

First round

|}

Second round

|}

Round of 16

Semi finals

|}

Finals

|}

External links
 1987–88 FIBA Korać Cup @ linguasport.com
1987–88 FIBA Korać Cup

1987–88
1987–88 in European basketball